Daniel Joseph Ricciardo  ( "Ricardo",  ; born 1 July 1989) is an Italian-Australian racing driver who last raced in Formula One driving for McLaren, under the Australian flag. He made his debut at the 2011 British Grand Prix with the HRT team as part of a deal with Red Bull Racing, for whom he was test driving under its sister team Scuderia Toro Rosso. He has achieved 8 Grand Prix victories in Formula One. He is the 3rd driver for Red Bull Racing from 2023.

Ricciardo joined Toro Rosso in 2012 full-time after the team changed its driver lineup and drove a Ferrari-powered car for them in 2012 and 2013. In 2014, Ricciardo was promoted to Red Bull as a replacement for the retired Mark Webber alongside multiple time world champion Sebastian Vettel. In his first season with Red Bull under Renault power, Ricciardo finished third in the championship with his first three Formula One wins, in Canada, Hungary, and Belgium.

After two years without a victory, Ricciardo returned to the top of the podium at the 2016 Malaysian Grand Prix, eventually sealing third in the championship for the second time in three years at the 2016 Mexican Grand Prix. He has since added victories for Red Bull at the Azerbaijan Grand Prix in 2017 and the Chinese and Monaco Grands Prix in 2018. After 2018, Ricciardo signed with Renault and raced for them in the 2019 and 2020 seasons. He joined McLaren for the 2021 and  Formula One seasons, alongside Lando Norris. He obtained his first race win with McLaren at the 2021 Italian Grand Prix. After the 2021 season, Ricciardo was appointed a Member of the Order of Australia in the 2022 Australia Day Honours.

Early and personal life
Daniel Joseph Ricciardo was born on 1 July 1989 in Perth, Western Australia, to Italian-Australian parents.  His father, Giuseppe "Joe" Ricciardo, was born in Ficarra (Messina), but relocated to Australia with his family aged just seven.  Ricciardo's mother, Grace was born in Australia, but had parents originally from Casignana (Calabria). Ricciardo also has a sister; Michelle. Growing up in Duncraig, one of Perth's northern suburbs, Ricciardo's earliest memories of motorsports were of his father racing at the nearby Barbagallo Raceway in Wanneroo. Raised Catholic, he attended high school at Newman College. He started karting at the age of 9.

Ricciardo pronounces his surname "Ricardo" instead of the Italian pronunciation "Rit-tchar-do", attributing this to the way it was usually pronounced growing up in Australia and by his family. He is often referred to as "the honey badger" referencing his racing style, explaining how "[i]t's supposed to be the most fearless animal in the animal kingdom. When you look at it, he seems quite cute and cuddly, but as soon as someone crosses his territory in a way he doesn't like, he turns into a bit of a savage and he'll go after anything – tigers, pythons – he turns very quickly, but he's a good guy." Growing up as a fan of NASCAR Cup Series driver Dale Earnhardt, Ricciardo adopted the number 3 as his racing number in honour of him.

Ricciardo supports the Australian Football League's West Coast Eagles and was the club's number-one ticket holder in 2015 and 2016. He is also a big UFC fan.

Early career

Karting, Formula Ford and Formula BMW
Ricciardo started karting at the age of nine, as a member of the Tiger Kart Club (TKC) and entered numerous karting events. In 2005, he entered the Western Australian Formula Ford championship driving a 15-year-old Van Diemen, finishing eighth by season's end. Towards the end of the season, Ricciardo took a leased 13-year-old Van Diemen across to Sandown Raceway in Melbourne to compete at the national Formula Ford series but his aging car was uncompetitive as he finished 16th, 17th and retired during the weekend's three races.
After finishing sixth in 2007 Formula Renault 2.0 Italia, Ricciardo was selected by Red Bull Junior Team.

Formula Three
During the mid-part of the 2008 season, Ricciardo made his Formula Three debut at the Nürburgring, joining SG Formula's Formula 3 Euro Series team. Despite only a short amount of experience in the car, Ricciardo qualified in eighth for the first race, which later converted into sixth in the race after James Jakes and Christian Vietoris stalled on the grid. But he struggled in the reverse-grid race, finishing just fifteenth.

Ricciardo moved to the British Formula 3 Championship for the 2009 season driving for Carlin Motorsport.

Ricciardo continued his partnership with Carlin, by heading to the Macau Grand Prix with the team.

Formula Renault 3.5 Series

On 30 October 2009, Ricciardo was signed by Tech 1 to compete in the 2010 season. He had competed with the team at the Autódromo Internacional do Algarve in Portugal in 2009, and was the teammate to Brendon Hartley, another driver who drove for Tech 1 over the season.

Following a minor incident during a mountain bike exercise, Ricciardo was forced to miss the second test of the 2010 season, but went on to take pole position for both races at the season-opening round of the 2010 season in Alcañiz, Spain. He finished third and second in the races respectively, to leave himself at the head of the championship standings. Two weeks later, at the Spa-Francorchamps circuit, Ricciardo was relegated to last on the grid after being deemed to have hindered the laps of other drivers. In the next two races, he finished 13th and fifth respectively – coming 2nd in the latter, until many of the front-runners were given penalties for infringing the parc ferme rules before the race. One week later, in Monte Carlo, Ricciardo secured his third pole position of the season, finishing three-tenths of a second ahead of championship rival Stefano Coletti. He secured his first win at the following race, one place ahead of Coletti. Ricciardo went on to secure two more wins at the Hungaroring and at the Hockenheimring in commanding fashion. Following Ricciardo's sixth pole from 12 races, Tech 1 team boss, Simon Abadie, praised his driver's efforts greatly, saying "I am happy, and happy for Daniel because six poles in 12 races is good going," and later stated his team's ambitions for success, by telling Autosport correspondent Peter Mills, "I really hopes Daniel wins the championship."

At the first race at the Silverstone circuit, Ricciardo was involved in a spectacular incident with pole-sitter Jon Lancaster, in which Ricciardo was sent into a barrel roll, eventually landing on his wheels. The crash saw the end of his race, with teammate Jean-Éric Vergne becoming the eventual winner, following disqualifications. Securing pole for the second race of the weekend, Ricciardo spent much of the race leading the pack by upwards of three seconds. However, braking issues in the second half of the event meant that, on the final lap, championship-rival Esteban Guerrieri was able to pass the Tech 1 racer.

Going into the final round of the season, Ricciardo sat just three points behind championship leader Mikhail Aleshin and 13 ahead of third-place man Esteban Guerrieri. Managing his 8th pole of the season, Ricciardo managed a lights-to-flag victory, setting the fastest lap and placing himself equal first with one race remaining. After securing second place on the grid for the second race of the weekend, Ricciardo managed to hold position until the pit stops, where he was successfully 'jumped' by two of his rivals, including teammate Vergne. With only two laps left in the race and struggling for pace, Ricciardo was overtaken by championship rival Aleshin. Finishing in that order, Ricciardo failed to secure the title in his debut year, losing out to Mikhail Aleshin by only two points.

In 2011 Ricciardo raced for ISR Racing prior to his HRT call-up.

Formula One career 

Ricciardo made his track debut at the wheel of a Formula One car, when he tested for Red Bull Racing at the young drivers test at Circuito de Jerez over three days, from 1–3 December 2009. On the final day of testing he clocked the fastest time of the test by over a second. This placed him as the only driver to go into the 1:17 bracket. Red Bull Racing's team manager Christian Horner suggested that Ricciardo may replace his 2010 World Series teammate Hartley as the team's test and reserve driver. As it turned out, Ricciardo and Hartley were to share test and reserve duties for both Red Bull, and sister team Scuderia Toro Rosso until the latter was removed from the Red Bull Junior team.

On 11 November 2010, Ricciardo was confirmed as the single driver to represent Red Bull Racing at the end-of-season young driver's test at the Yas Marina Circuit, on 16–17 November. At the announcement, he commented, "I can't wait to get another crack at driving Red Bull Racing's amazing Formula One car." Ricciardo continued to show his one-lap prowess and dominated the event, with his fastest lap being 1.3 seconds faster than  World Champion Sebastian Vettel's qualifying lap the Saturday before.

Days after completing this session, Ricciardo was confirmed as Toro Rosso's test and reserve driver for the  season, and would take part in the first free practice session of each race weekend. Franz Tost, Toro Rosso team principal stated that "having a hungry youngster on the books will keep our current driver pairing nice and sharp", referring to then Toro Rosso drivers Jaime Alguersuari and Sébastien Buemi.

HRT (2011) 

Ricciardo made his Grand Prix debut at the 2011 British Grand Prix at Silverstone.

However, on 22 October 2011, a few days before the inaugural Indian Grand Prix, the race where Karthikeyan was due to gain back his seat for his home race, HRT F1 announced that Vitantonio Liuzzi made way for Karthikeyan, allowing Ricciardo to race in India and extend his learning curve that Red Bull Racing paid the struggling Spanish team to do, as well as allowing Karthikeyan to race in front of his home fans.

Toro Rosso (2012–2013)

2012 

On 14 December 2011, it was confirmed that Ricciardo would drive for the Scuderia Toro Rosso for the 2012 season, alongside Frenchman Jean-Éric Vergne.

At the 2012 Australian Grand Prix on 18 March 2012, Ricciardo managed to overtake his teammate Vergne late on the last lap to come home in ninth place, securing his first two World Championship points.

In wet conditions in Malaysia he finished 12th, after having been first to switch to slick tyres. In Bahrain he qualified sixth, but dropped back during the race and finished 15th. In Monaco he suffered his only retirement of the season, after having started from 15th position.

2013 

Toro Rosso re-signed Ricciardo for the 2013 season.

Ricciardo out-scored his teammate Jean-Éric Vergne by seven points and out-qualified him for over 3/4 of the season. His impressive qualifying efforts of 30–7 against Vergne over their two years together helped promote him to Toro Rosso senior team, Red Bull, replacing fellow countryman Mark Webber. Ricciardo finished 13th in the championship with 20 points.

Red Bull (2014–2018) 
Ricciardo replaced Mark Webber at Infiniti Red Bull Racing at the start of the 2014 Formula One season, partnering Sebastian Vettel, a four-time world champion.

2014 

Ricciardo was later disqualified, as his car was ruled to have exceeded the mandated hourly fuel flow rate limit. Had he not been disqualified, it would have marked the first time an Australian had made the podium at the Australian Grand Prix since the race became part of the World Championship. Infiniti Red Bull Racing filed an appeal against the disqualification, which was rejected by the International Court of Appeal, the FIA decision being upheld.

His victory in Canada broke the chain of six Mercedes victories that marked the beginning of the 2014 season.

He was in third place behind Alonso and Hamilton with less than four laps remaining and overtook Hamilton's Mercedes with a pass on the outside of the Hungaroring's turn two. He then easily caught and passed Alonso's Ferrari as he had very little grip left on his tyres – television footage of his left front tyre after the race showed it to be badly blistered. In the final two laps, Ricciardo pulled away to win the race by 5.225 seconds. His teammate Vettel survived a spin coming onto the main straight late in the race to finish seventh. Ricciardo became the second Australian to win the Hungarian Grand Prix, after Mark Webber's victory – also for Red Bull – in 2010.

On 4 October 2014, it was announced that Ricciardo would partner Daniil Kvyat for the  season, following the announcement of Vettel's departure from the team. For his 2014 performances, Ricciardo won the Laureus World Sports Award for Breakthrough of the Year in April 2015.

2015 

On 8 February 2015, during the third episode of series 22 of the popular British motoring television programme Top Gear, Ricciardo became the fastest Formula One driver to perform a lap of the Top Gear test track during the Star in a Reasonably Priced Car feature, beating the previous record-holder Lewis Hamilton with a time of 1:42.2.

In 2015, Red Bull slipped behind Ferrari and Williams in their efforts to take the title fight to Mercedes. The Red Bull cars were held back by the Renault power unit having been out-developed by Mercedes and Ferrari. The RB11 only showed pace in slow and twisty high downforce tracks or rain, highlighting the car's strong chassis.

Ricciardo achieved his first top-five finish in Monaco with fifth and the fastest lap of the race. While tussling for second in Hungary with Nico Rosberg, his race-winning charge ground to a halt when the two clashed while hunting down Sebastian Vettel. Ricciardo managed to finish third behind his teammate. It was his first podium since the 2014 United States Grand Prix. He recorded his second podium of the season in Singapore where he finished second and recorded his third fastest lap of the season.

Ricciardo finished the season with 92 points in eighth place in the championship, three points behind teammate Daniil Kvyat. He out-qualified Kvyat 14–5.

2016 

In a much more competitive Red Bull, Ricciardo began the season well, finishing 4th in both Australia and Bahrain and qualifying 2nd and then leading early on in the Chinese Grand Prix before suffering a tyre blowout and finishing in 4th again.

Ricciardo qualified third at the Spanish Grand Prix, and after the two Mercedes cars of Lewis Hamilton and Nico Rosberg crashed out on the first lap, he led the early stages of the race. After a remarkable strategy call by Ferrari resulting in a very short third stint for Sebastian Vettel, Red Bull decided to answer this by pitting Ricciardo again and covering Vettel, also going for the presumed faster three-stop strategy. This dropped him behind Vettel, new teammate Max Verstappen and Kimi Räikkönen on track, and after a few failed attempts at passing Vettel, a tyre blowout late on in the race meant that he finished fourth again, behind eventual winner Verstappen, and the Ferraris of Räikkönen and Vettel.

Ricciardo scored his first pole position at the Monaco Grand Prix, and led the early wet stages of the race. However, after a very long pitstop in which his team took nearly 40 seconds to ready a set of tyres he lost the race lead to Lewis Hamilton and finished the race in 2nd. Ricciardo was notably upset after the race result, saying: "Two weekends in a row I've been screwed now. It sucks. It hurts."

Ricciardo returned to the podium in Hungary, finishing third, and in Germany, where he finished second. On the podium in Germany, Ricciardo performed a new celebration, where he drank champagne out of his shoe. He calls this celebration the "shoey".  He repeated the celebration at the Belgian Grand Prix (where he came second again), this time persuading podium interviewer Mark Webber to also drink from the shoe.

Ricciardo qualified and finished second at the Singapore Grand Prix, after pushing eventual winner Rosberg hard near the end, a late strategy change pushing him to under half a second behind at the finish line.

Ricciardo qualified fourth at the Malaysian Grand Prix but moved up to second into turn one, after a collision between Sebastian Vettel and Nico Rosberg. He then took the lead late on in the race when leader Lewis Hamilton retired with an engine failure. After fighting with his Red Bull teammate Verstappen, Ricciardo took his first victory of the season. He repeated his "shoey" celebration on the podium, and was able to get team boss Christian Horner as well as podium sharers Verstappen and Rosberg to repeat the celebration. Ricciardo eventually sealed third in the Drivers' Championship following a podium finish in Mexico. Other than Sergio Pérez, he is the only driver to have been classified in every race of the 2016 season. In fact, save for just two races in which Ricciardo equalled the previous year's result, he improved on every other race result from 2015.

2017 

Ricciardo qualified 10th in Australia after spinning into the tyre barrier in Q3. He incurred a five-place grid penalty due to an unscheduled gearbox change as a result of the crash. A gearbox sensor issue prevented him from taking the start and when he did get going, two laps down, a sudden fuel pressure problem ended his race after 25 laps. He won his fifth Grand Prix at the first Azerbaijan Grand Prix, after qualifying 10th. He finished on the podium five times in a row between Spain and Austria, and then three times in a row in Singapore, Malaysia and Japan. Despite having maintained fourth in the drivers' championship for much of the season, retirements in three of the last four races (including the final race at Abu Dhabi) saw Ricciardo drop down to 5th in the championship, five points behind Kimi Räikkönen.

2018 

Ricciardo started the season with a fourth-place in Australia, from eighth on the grid after a three-place penalty for speeding under red flag conditions. In Bahrain, he recorded a non-finish after an electrical failure on the second lap. His result in the 2018 Chinese Grand Prix was much better, taking a commanding victory by almost nine seconds, after starting sixth on the grid. At the 2018 Azerbaijan Grand Prix, Ricciardo was fighting for fourth with teammate Max Verstappen in the latter half of the race. His front wing made heavy contact with his teammate's rear, and the incident caused both drivers to retire. At the 2018 Spanish Grand Prix, Ricciardo finished fifth and set the track record, despite spinning under the virtual safety car. Coming into the 2018 Monaco Grand Prix, Ricciardo and Verstappen were considered favourites to win the race due to their cars superior chassis and down-force. Ricciardo topped all three practice sessions before qualifying, breaking the lap record with each session. Ricciardo managed to secure the second pole of his career at Monaco, topping every qualifying session as well and setting a new lap record again. In the race, Ricciardo managed to hold off the Ferrari of Sebastian Vettel to take his first Monaco Grand Prix victory and his first Grand Prix win from pole position, despite having to manage a loss of power due to a MGU-K power output issue throughout the race. Later in the season, he tied for the most retirements in the 2018 season, with 8 retirements in total. He managed four fastest laps for the season, in Australia, China, Spain and Hungary and finished the season sixth in the World Drivers' Championship with 170 points.

Renault (2019–2020)

2019 
 
On 3 August 2018, it was announced that Ricciardo had signed a contract to drive for Renault in 2019 and 2020. Ricciardo's teammate for the 2019 season was Nico Hülkenberg. Ricciardo had a poor start to the season with retirements in the first two races, from front wing damage in Australia and power failure in Bahrain. A 7th-place finish in China followed. In Azerbaijan, Ricciardo reversed into Daniil Kvyat when both cars stopped after an overtake attempt by Ricciardo, causing race-ending damage for both drivers and Ricciardo's third retirement in four races. Six consecutive race finishes followed, including a strong 4th place in qualifying and 6th-place finish in Canada. Ricciardo then suffered an exhaust failure at the German Grand Prix.

At the Italian Grand Prix, Ricciardo finished in 4th place, his best result of the year. Ricciardo was involved in a first-lap collision in Russia, leading to his eventual retirement. He was initially classified 6th in Japan, before both Renault cars were disqualified ten days later for using illegal driver aids. Three consecutive points finishes followed, with strong 6th-place finishes in the United States and Brazil.

Ricciardo ended a relatively disappointing season for Renault in 9th place in the championship, with 54 points, ahead of teammate Hülkenberg.

2020 

Ricciardo had a new teammate for the 2020 season with Hülkenberg being replaced by Esteban Ocon. Ricciardo started the season with a retirement at the 2020 Austrian Grand Prix after his Renault R.S.20 overheated. In this next race, the 2020 Styrian Grand Prix, Ricciardo was running in sixth place with two laps remaining, but was overtaken by Lance Stroll and Lando Norris. He finished the race in eighth. Ricciardo qualified eleventh at the 2020 Hungarian Grand Prix, and finished the race in eighth place.

At the 2020 British Grand Prix, Ricciardo finished in fourth place, equaling his best result for Renault. He was running in sixth place before late tyre punctures for Carlos Sainz Jr. and Valtteri Bottas promoted him to fourth. At the 70th Anniversary Grand Prix, Ricciardo qualified fifth, but spun midway through the race and finished fourteenth. Ricciardo qualified thirteenth and finished eleventh at the next race in Spain.

Ricciardo would go on an eleven race point-scoring streak until the end of the season, starting with the 2020 Belgian Grand Prix. He qualified and finished in fourth place, as well as taking the fastest lap on the last lap of the race. At the 2020 Italian Grand Prix, he qualified seventh and finished in sixth place. At the 2020 Tuscan Grand Prix, he qualified eighth and was running in third place for the majority of the race, but was overtaken by Alex Albon of Red Bull, leaving him to have to finish in fourth place.

At the Russian Grand Prix, Ricciardo was fastest in the second qualifying segment, but only managed to qualify in fifth place. In the race, he finished in fifth place despite a 5-second penalty for violating track limits. At the 2020 Eifel Grand Prix, Ricciardo qualified sixth and finished third, scoring the team's first podium since the 2011 Malaysian Grand Prix. This was Ricciardo's first podium since joining Renault, and his first since the 2018 Monaco Grand Prix. In the next race, the 2020 Portuguese Grand Prix, he started tenth after having a crash towards the end of the second segment of qualifying, damaging his rear wing. He finished ninth in the race. He reached the podium a second time for Renault at the 2020 Emilia Romagna Grand Prix. Starting fifth on the grid, he overtook Pierre Gasly on the first lap, before being overcut by Pérez after being stuck behind traffic. However, a tyre failure and the retirement of former teammate Max Verstappen and a strategy error by Pérez's team Racing Point allowed him to finish in third place. In the 2020 Bahrain Grand Prix, he started sixth, and overtook Valtteri Bottas on the first lap. However, following a red flag he had a poor second start, which dropped him down to tenth place. He eventually finished in seventh place. At the 2020 Sakhir Grand Prix, he had a chance of a podium after Charles Leclerc, Max Verstappen, and Sergio Pérez all collided in the first lap of the race. But a mistimed second pit stop caused Ricciardo to be overtaken, ending the race in fifth place. In his final race for Renault at the 2020 Abu Dhabi Grand Prix, he qualified twelfth; however a good first stint allowed him to exit the pits in seventh place. He also took the fastest lap of the race on the final lap. He finished in fifth place in the championship standings with 119 points, six points behind Sergio Pérez in fourth.

McLaren (2021–2022)

2021 

After two years at Renault, Ricciardo joined McLaren for the 2021 Formula One World Championship as a replacement for Carlos Sainz Jr. who had signed a multi-year deal with Ferrari. He partnered with Lando Norris, who was retained by the team.

On lap four Pierre Gasly collided with Ricciardo, causing floor damage to his car resulting in the loss of a considerable amount of downforce. Despite the performance loss, Ricciardo was able to finish the season opener in seventh.

Ricciardo moved up to fifth on the opening lap but was subsequently unable to keep pace with the top four cars in the wet conditions and was ordered to let Norris past to contend for the podium, which he did. Ricciardo finished the race in sixth.

He recovered to ninth during the race. He defended fifth from Red Bull driver Sergio Pérez until lap 45, where Pérez was able to get past at turn one. He finished sixth, marking the first time in the season he finished ahead of Norris.

A crash in qualifying at the  meant Ricciardo started the race in thirteenth, though he was able to climb up into the points during the race, and finished ninth.

By the end of the fifth lap, he had moved up to eighth, but on lap seven he suffered a loss in power which saw him drop down to fourteenth, and he finished in thirteenth.

The  saw Ricciardo qualify in 7th place, just behind his teammate. He finished Formula One's first-ever sprint race in 6th place after an overtaking move on Fernando Alonso in the closing stages. Starting the Grand Prix from 6th, Ricciardo benefited from Max Verstappen's retirement to finish in 5th place. This was his first top 5 finish at McLaren.

The final race before the summer break, the  saw Ricciardo qualify in 11th. A chaotic start to the race, which saw 7 cars eliminated meant Ricciardo climb to 2nd place by the first corner only for him to be wiped out of the race by another collision and finished the race in 11th after picking up significant damage to his car.

The race on Sunday was delayed multiple due to torrential rain and was abandoned after 2 laps behind the safety car. As a result, Ricciardo was classified 4th and scored 6 points.

On race day he was denied a points finish after conceding his 10th position during the closing stages, under orders from the team, to Lando Norris, who was on fresher tyres. Nonetheless, it was a weekend where Ricciardo was the quicker of the 2 McLaren drivers.

During the sprint race on Saturday, Ricciardo gained 2 positions on the opening lap to finish in 3rd position, earning 1 championship point. As a result of a grid penalty for Valtteri Bottas, he started Sunday's Grand Prix on the front row. This also marked the third race in a row where he had out-qualified his teammate. At the start of the race, Ricciardo got a better start than polesitter Max Verstappen and took the lead into turn 1. He held off Verstappen for 21 laps, surviving a safety car restart and late pressure from Norris whom he led home to claim his first victory for McLaren while also setting the fastest lap. This was also the team's first win since the 2012 Brazilian Grand Prix and their first 1-2 finish since the 2010 Canadian Grand Prix.

A late rain shower in the final few laps saw Ricciardo pit for intermediate tyres and work his way up to 4th place despite a poor start and slow pit stop earlier during the race.

During the race, he managed to progress up to 13th.

He was then promoted to 6th place on the grid as a result of a grid penalty for Valtteri Bottas. Overtaking Sainz on lap 1 following a three-way battle between himself, Sainz and Norris. He managed to hold on to 5th place, defending from Sainz and helping McLaren score crucial points in the battle for third place in the Constructors' Championship with Ferrari, while Norris finished 8th.

He would be McLaren's main driver for the race, as Norris started last with an engine penalty. Ricciardo made a blistering start and was alongside Sergio Pérez for 4th place heading into turn one. He had a small lockup and made contact with Valtteri Bottas at turn one and suffered damage to his front wing. After a pitstop, he fell to last place and could only recover to 12th place, while teammate Norris was able to come from the back of the grid to finish in 10th place.

Ricciardo managed to end his pointless streak at the penultimate race in Saudi Arabia. Despite getting knocked out in Q2, qualifying in 11th place, he benefitted from decent pace and a pit-stop during red flags to gain positions. He ran in 4th after the second red flag, challenging Esteban Ocon for the podium position before he lost his 4th place to eventual third-place finisher Valtteri Bottas and settled for fifth place.

At the final race of the season in Abu Dhabi, Ricciardo managed to qualify in 10th place. He then finished 12th after he was overcut by Fernando Alonso and Pierre Gasly as a result of a virtual safety car. He ended the season in 8th place in the drivers standings, scoring 115 points with just one podium, his race win at Monza.

2022 
Ricciardo missed the final day of the 2022 pre-season test in Bahrain, due to a positive COVID-19 test on 11 March. He was released from isolation in time for the opening race of the season, on 20 March. 

In the opening season race at the Bahrain Grand Prix, the Australian qualified 18th and finished the race in 14th ahead of his teammate Norris in 15th, due to a lack of pace and three driver retirements.

At the Saudi Arabian Grand Prix, Ricciardo qualified 12th, and was running in 9th during the race. However, he brought out the virtual safety car on lap 35 after his McLaren stopped at the pit lane exit due to an engine failure. 

At the Australian Grand Prix, Ricciardo managed to qualify in 7th place, and finished in 6th place behind his teammate Norris in his home Grand Prix. 

At the Emilia Romagna Grand Prix, Ricciardo qualified in 6th place for the sprint race on that Saturday, where he managed to maintain 6th place during the sprint for the race. During the first lap of the race, Ricciardo collided with Carlos Sainz Jr., causing Sainz to retire from the race, and damaging Ricciardo's front wing. At the end of the race, Ricciardo  finished in last place, while his teammate, Norris finished on the podium with 3rd place.

At the Miami Grand Prix, Ricciardo qualified 14th and finished the race in 13th place after his teammate retired. After making it to Q3 and qualifying ninth for the 2022 Spanish Grand Prix, Ricciardo failed to score points and finished twelfth. In the build up to the Monaco Grand Prix Ricciardo was criticised for his early season performance relative to team mate Lando Norris by McLaren Racing CEO Zak Brown in an interview Brown gave to Sky Sports F1 stating Ricciardo's poor early  season results  had "not met his [Ricciardo's] or our expectations." Ricciardo finished eighth in Azerbaijan ahead of his team mate Lando Norris, a track on which he has previously won. He then failed to score points in the Canadian Grand Prix. At the British Grand Prix Ricciardo qualified 14th and could only finish the race one place higher in 13th after complaining  post-race of lacking grip during the race. After two ninth placed points scoring results Austria and France. Ricciardo finished pointless at the Hungarian Grand Prix finishing 15th having received a 5 second penalty for colliding with Lance Stroll during the race.

In August 2022, McLaren and Ricciardo terminated his contract a year early, by mutual agreement. Thanks to a marginally stronger second half of the season, where he scored points in three of his last six races, Ricciardo was able to finish the season in 11th position in the Drivers' Championship, although McLaren would finish behind Alpine in the Constructors' Championship. Despite his late season improvement, Ricciardo still finished the 2022 season with a considerable eighty-five point deficit to team mate Norris, who finished seventh in the Drivers Championship.

Red Bull third driver (2023–) 
After leaving McLaren at the conclusion of the 2022 season, Ricciardo elected to rejoin Red Bull Racing as a third driver for 2023 season. The role will see him complete PR activities, assist in simulator and factory work, and while attending race weekends, has access to chat channels and communications to support the race team.

Awards 
 BRDC The Bruce McLaren Trophy: 2013
 Trofeo Lorenzo Bandini: 2014
 Confartigianato Motori Driver of the Year: 2014
 GQ Australia Sportsman of the Year: 2014
 BRDC The Bruce McLaren Trophy: 2014
 BRDC The Innes Ireland Trophy: 2014
 BRDC The Innes Ireland Trophy: 2015
 Laureus World Sports Award for Breakthrough Performance of the Year: 2015
 BRDC The Bruce McLaren Trophy: 2016
 Confartigianato Motori Driver of the Year: 2018
 Appointed Member of the Order of Australia (AM) in the 2022 Australia Day Honours for "significant service to motor sport as a competitor and ambassador, and to the community".

Karting record

Karting career summary

Racing record

Racing career summary

Complete Formula Renault 3.5 Series results
(key) (Races in bold indicate pole position; races in italics indicate fastest lap)

Complete Macau Grand Prix results

Complete Formula One results
(key) (Races in bold indicate pole position; races in italics indicate fastest lap)

 Did not finish, but was classified as he had completed more than 90% of the race distance.
 Half points awarded as less than 75% of race distance was completed.

References

Further reading

External links

 
 
 
 Profile at Formula1.com
 

1989 births
Australian expatriate sportspeople in Monaco
Australian Formula One drivers
Australian people of Calabrian descent
Australian people of Italian descent
Australian people of Sicilian descent
British Formula Three Championship drivers
Formula 3 Euro Series drivers
Formula BMW Asia drivers
Formula BMW UK drivers
Formula Ford drivers
Formula One race winners
Formula Renault 2.0 WEC drivers
Formula Renault Eurocup drivers
HRT Formula One drivers
Italian Formula Renault 2.0 drivers
Laureus World Sports Awards winners
Living people
McLaren Formula One drivers
Members of the Order of Australia
People educated at Newman College, Perth
Red Bull Formula One drivers
Renault Formula One drivers
Racing drivers from Perth, Western Australia
Toro Rosso Formula One drivers
World Series Formula V8 3.5 drivers
Eurasia Motorsport drivers
Motaworld Racing drivers
Fortec Motorsport drivers
RP Motorsport drivers
SG Formula drivers
Carlin racing drivers
Tech 1 Racing drivers
ISR Racing drivers